The South Korea national beach soccer team represented South Korea in international beach soccer and was governed by the Korea Football Association. It is not currently being managed and was officially organized only once when the first Asian Beach Games was held in 2008. Besides official record, South Korea participated in unofficial Intercontinental Cup in 1995 and 1996.

Squad
The following players and staff members were called up for the 2008 Asian Beach Games.

Head coach: Park Mal-bong
Assistant coach: Kim Hae-gook

Competitive record

Asian Beach Games

See also

Korea Football Association

References

External links
 Official website, KFA.or.kr 

Korea Republic
Beach soccer